The White Man's Law is a surviving 1918 American silent drama film directed by James Young and written by Marion Fairfax and John B. Browne. The film stars Sessue Hayakawa, Florence Vidor, Jack Holt, Herbert Standing, Mayme Kelso, and Forrest Seabury. The film was released on May 6, 1918, by Paramount Pictures.

Plot
As described in a film magazine, Sir Harry Falkland (Holt), having lost the respect of his wife and facing prosecution for forgery, leaves England and goes to Africa as part of an ivory commission. Maida Verne (Vidor), a French-Sudanese maid, captivates his eye, and after he declares his love for her, she is compromised in the eyes of her fiancé John A. Genghis (Hayakawa), the son of a sheik and an Oxford graduate. While on the trip to the interior in search of ivory, Genghis discovers Falkland's duplicity through a letter from his wife. In the fight that ensues Genghis is worsted and Falkland returns with a tale of the death of the young native. The impending arrival of Lady Falkland (Selwynne) dispels Maida's dream of love and her demand for the restoration of her good name is met with indifference by Falkland. Genghis, who has miraculously escaped death, returns and after besting Falkland in a fight gives him permission to commit suicide. Falkland's death is reported to his wife as an accident and Genghis and Maida prepare for marriage.

Cast
Sessue Hayakawa as John A. Genghis
Florence Vidor as Maida Verne
Jack Holt as Sir Harry Falkland
Herbert Standing as Sir Robert Hope
Mayme Kelso as Mrs. Mayhew 
Forrest Seabury as Cpl. Verne
Josef Swickard as Suliman Ghengis 
Ernest Joy as Sir Harry's Father
Charles West as The Derelict
Noah Beery, Sr. as Dr. Robinson
Frank Deshon as Falkland's Valet
Clarissa Selwynne as Lady Falkland

Preservation
A print is preserved in the Gosfilmofond Russian State Archive in Moscow.

References

External links

Still at silentera.com

1918 films
1910s English-language films
Silent American drama films
1918 drama films
Paramount Pictures films
Films directed by James Young
American black-and-white films
American silent feature films
1910s American films